Kire Markoski (born 20 February 1995) is a Macedonian footballer who plays for FK Vardar and Macedonia national football team as a winger.

Club career

Rabotnički
On 6 August 2015, Markoski scored his first European goal, a 112th minute winner in a 1–1 extra-time (2–1 aggregate) win over Turkish side Trabzonspor in the second leg of the Europa League third qualifying round.

International career
Markoski made his senior debut in a friendly on 18 June 2014, a 2–0 loss against China.

International goals
Scores and results list North Macedonia's goal tally first.

Honours
Rabotnički
Macedonian First League: 2013–14
Macedonian Cup: 2013–14, 2014–15

Spartak Trnava
 Slovak Cup: 2018–19

References

External links
 
 

1995 births
Living people
Sportspeople from Ohrid
Association football wingers
Macedonian footballers
Macedonian expatriate footballers
North Macedonia under-21 international footballers
North Macedonia international footballers
FK Rabotnički players
AEL Limassol players
FC Spartak Trnava players
MFK Karviná players
Macedonian First Football League players
Cypriot First Division players
Slovak Super Liga players
Expatriate footballers in Cyprus
Expatriate footballers in Slovakia
Expatriate footballers in the Czech Republic
Macedonian expatriate sportspeople in Cyprus
Macedonian expatriate sportspeople in Slovakia
Macedonian expatriate sportspeople in the Czech Republic